Leonidas Maleckis (born 8 March 1966) is a Lithuanian boxer. He competed in the men's light middleweight event at the 1992 Summer Olympics.

References

1966 births
Living people
Lithuanian male boxers
Olympic boxers of Lithuania
Boxers at the 1992 Summer Olympics
Sportspeople from Vilnius
Light-middleweight boxers